The  is a 6-axle (Bo-Bo-Bo wheel arrangement) DC electric locomotive type operated on passenger and freight services in Japan since 1965. A total of 308 locomotives were built between 1965 and 1979, with 52 still in service .

Variants
The class was initially divided into the EF65-0 subclass for general freight and the EF65-500 subclass for express freight and passenger use.
 EF65-0: Numbers EF65 1 – 135
 EF65-500: Numbers EF65 501 – 542
 EF65-1000: Numbers EF65 1001 – 1139
 EF65-2000:

Background and history
The Class EF65 was designed by Japanese National Railways (JNR) as a standard locomotive type developed from the earlier Class EF60 design for use primarily on the Tokaido Main Line and Sanyo Main Line.

Operations
During the JNR era, these locomotives were used for freight trains and also for passenger work - primarily hauling night trains such as the Izumo sleeping car limited express and Ginga sleeping car express.

EF65-0
The EF65-0 subclass was designed for general freight use on the Tokaido Main Line and Sanyo Main Line. 135 locomotives were built between 1965 and 1970.

, all EF65-0 locomotives had been withdrawn.

EF67 banker conversions

Five 6th-batch Class EF65-0 locomotives, numbers EF65 131 to EF65 135, were converted in 1990 and 1991 to become Class EF67-100 banking locomotives for use on the "Senohachi" section of the Sanyo Main Line.

EF65-500

, only one EF65-500 locomotive, EF65-501, owned by JR East, remained in service.

P/F designation
Locomotives used for hauling passenger services are referred to as "P" type, and those used for freight services are referred to as "F" type. The original designations are as shown below.

EF65-1000
The EF65-1000 was intended for use on both passenger and freight services, and was referred to as the "PF" type. 139 locomotives were built between 1969 and 1979.

, 15 EF65-1000 locomotives remained in service, operated by JR East and JR West.

EF65-2000

, 36 EF65-2000 locomotives remained in service, operated by JR Freight.

Fleet changes

Livery variations
 EF65 9: Repainted in early-style all-over brown livery with white  lettering on the side
 EF65 57: Repainted in early-style all-over brown livery
 EF65 105: Repainted in Euroliner livery
 EF65 116: Repainted in blue with large yellow "JR" lettering on the sides and yellow bands on the cab ends
 EF65 123: Repainted in Yuyu Salon Okayama livery (initially maroon, later orange)
 EF65 1019: Repainted in Super Express Rainbow red livery in March 1987. Removed from service on 31 December 1997, and withdrawn on 1 September 1998.
 EF65 1059: Repainted in blue with yellow front-end warning panels and large "JR" logo in July 1987. Remained in this livery until withdrawal on 31 March 2009.
 EF65 1065: Experimental JR Freight livery
 EF65 1118: Super Express Rainbow livery
 EF65 1124: Twilight Express dark green and yellow livery from November 2015

Gallery

Preserved examples
 EF65 1: Preserved at the Kyoto Railway Museum in Kyoto.
 EF65 5: JR Freight Ōi Depot in Shinagawa, Tokyo (training use)
 EF65 520: Usui Pass Railway Heritage Park, Gunma Prefecture
 EF65 535: Originally stored at Ōmiya Works, Saitama Prefecture, and donated to Toshiba in Fuchu, Tokyo in March 2013
 EF65 536: Sekisui Kinzoku factory, Saitama Prefecture (cab only)
 EF65 539: Privately preserved in Gunma Prefecture (cab only)
 EF65 1001: JR Freight Ōi Depot in Shinagawa, Tokyo (training use)

See also
 Japan Railways locomotive numbering and classification
 Railway electrification in Japan

References

Electric locomotives of Japan
EF65
Bo-Bo-Bo locomotives
1500 V DC locomotives
1067 mm gauge locomotives of Japan
Railway locomotives introduced in 1965
Toshiba locomotives